A face shield, an item of personal protective equipment (PPE), aims to protect the wearer's entire face (or part of it) from hazards such as flying objects and road debris, chemical splashes (in  laboratories or in industry), or potentially  infectious materials (in medical and laboratory environments). Depending on the type used, a face shield may protect its wearer from a physical hazard, chemical splashes, or biological hazards.

Industry
A face shield is intended to protect the wearer's partial or entire face and the eyes from hazards. Face shields should be used with spectacles and/or goggles.

Standards
ANSI (American Standard)
 Mark Z87: Basic impact: Faceshields shall be capable of resisting impact from a 25.4 mm (1 in) diameter steel ball dropped from a height of 127 cm (50 in).
 Mark Z87+: High impact: Faceshields shall be capable of resisting impact from a 6.35 mm (0.25 in) diameter steel ball traveling at a velocity of 91.4 m/s (300 ft/s). 

EN 166 (European Standard)
These shields are for protection against high-speed particles, and must withstand the impact of a 6 mm nominal diameter steel ball, striking the oculars and the lateral protection at the speed stated.
 Mark A: 190 m/s.
 Mark B: 120 m/s.
 Mark F: 45 m/s.
 ref. EN166

CSA (Canadian Standard)
Z94.3-15 Eye and Face Protectors Class 6 relates to face shields, and is divided into 3 sub-classes
6A – Impact, piercing, splash, head, and glare protection.
6B – Radiation protection. Also for low heat, splash, glare, and light non-piercing impact protection.
6C – High-heat applications and light non-piercing impact protection only.
ref. CSA Z94.3-15

See also welding helmet.

Materials
Polycarbonate (PC)

Provides excellent impact resistance, optical quality, heat resistance and normal chemical resistance.

Cellulose acetate (CA)

Provides normal impact resistance, optical quality, heat resistance and good chemical resistance.

Manufacturing
Two methods are used to manufacture face shields: extrusion and injection molding. Faceshields cut from extrusion sheets provide better impact resistance than injection molded faceshields because extrusion sheets are made of high molecular weight plastic pellets while injection molding must use lower molecular weight plastic pellets, which provide better melt flowing property needed by injection molding. For example, even faceshields 0.8 mm thick made of extrusion polycarbonate sheets can withstand the impact of a 6 mm nominal diameter steel ball traveling at the speed 120 m/s (European standard, protection against high-speed particles – medium energy impact), while injection molding faceshields must have at least 1.5 mm thickness to withstand the same impact. But injection molding can provide more complicated shape than extrusion.

During the COVID-19 pandemic, people from 86 countries engaged in the voluntary production of PPE to supplement traditional supply chains - many of which had been interrupted. They collectively produced a total of 25 million face shields with techniques including 3D printing, Laser cutting, Injection molding.

Medical

In medical applications, "face shield" refers to a variety of devices used to protect a medical professional during a procedure that might expose them to blood or other potentially infectious fluids. An example is the use of a CPR mask while performing rescue breathing or CPR. Another example is the use of personal protective equipment to guard the face against exposure to potentially infectious materials.

Police and military

In military or law enforcement environments, a face shield may be designed for ballistic or non-ballistic protection. The non-ballistic shield will provide no protection from projectiles shot from firearms, but is usually designed to withstand low velocity impacts, like caused by punches or thrown objects.  

A ballistic face shield is designed to stop or deflect blast and fragments from operators wearing bomb suits To protect the wearers eyes and face from ballistic threats in combat is envisioned in the PEO Soldier program for the United States Department of Defense.

Usage in construction 
On many construction sites many workers use face shields to protect them from debris or sparks. Many tools for cutting and working with metal recommend the use of a face shield. Examples include welding equipment or metal chop saws.

See also
 Pocket mask
 Helmet
 Visor
 Windshield
 Face masks during the COVID-19 pandemic

References

External links
 
Face Shield in India

Bandy equipment
Body armor
Emergency medical equipment
Headgear
Ice hockey equipment
Protective gear
Safety clothing